The mimic octopus (Thaumoctopus mimicus) is a species of octopus from the Indo-Pacific region. Like other octopuses, it uses its chromatophores to disguise itself with its background. However, it is noteworthy for being able to impersonate a wide variety of other marine animals. Although many animals mimic either their environment or other animals to avoid predation, the mimic octopus and its close relative the wunderpus are the only ones known to actively imitate a number of animals in order to elude predators.

Appearance
Small horns protrude from each eye. The octopus' natural color is light brown/beige, but it usually takes on a more noticeable hue of striped white and brown to scare off predators by imitating poisonous species and vicious, territorial sea creatures. Its ability to change shape is the reason it was named the "mimic" octopus, which is its main defense besides camouflage.

Habitat and range

The mimic octopus was first discovered off the coast of Sulawesi, Indonesia in 1998 on the bottom of a muddy river mouth. It has since been found to inhabit the Indo-Pacific, ranging from the Red Sea and Gulf of Oman in the west to New Caledonia in the east, and Gulf of Thailand and the Philippines in the north to the Great Barrier Reef in south. Most documented records are from Indonesia. It prefers obscuring murky and muddy sea floors to blend in with its natural brown-beige coloring.

Behavior
The mimic octopus uses a jet of water through its funnel to glide over the sand while searching for prey, typically small fish, crabs, and worms.  It prefers river mouths and estuaries, as opposed to reefs which are usually preferred as shelter by other types of octopus. This is due to its ability to impersonate toxic animals, putting it at less risk of predation than others in the open.

Mimic octopuses have been observed mimicking numerous different species of animals, some animals being mimicked more often than others. Among the animals mimicked are lion fish (the octopus holds its arms out radially to mimic the fish's spines), sea snake (hiding 6 of its arms, it holds the remaining 2 parallel to each other), jellyfish (by inflating its mantle and trailing its arms behind it), and zebra sole (holding all 8 arms behind it as it uses its siphon to swim). The octopus' mimicry of flatfish may be its preferred guise; in a period of 5 days nearly 500 instances of flatfish mimicry were seen. Not only does the mimic octopus use its ability to defend from predators, it also uses aggressive mimicry to approach wary prey, for example mimicking a crab as an apparent mate, only to devour its deceived suitor.

The mimic octopus retains the ability to camouflage with its sandy environment. It was also observed to mimic sessile animals such as small sponges, tube-worm tubes, or colonial tunicates.

The octopus may be able to intelligently use its mimicry based on the situation. For example, an octopus which was being harassed by damselfish mimicked a banded sea snake, a damselfish predator. It decides which mimicry behavior would be most appropriate and acts upon it.

Feeding
The mimic octopus can either be classified as a hunter or a forager. It is believed to be a hunter because scientists have observed and recorded the octopus having the ability to stalk prey and hunt down small fish and catch them. More often, however, the mimic octopus can be seen foraging for food. It does this by using a jet of water through its siphon to glide over the sand while searching for prey, and using its slender tentacles to reach into crevices in coral, as well as holes in the sand, and use its suction cups to grab small crustaceans and eat them.  Because the mimic octopus prefers to live in shallow, murky waters, it is believed that its diet consists almost exclusively of small fish and crustaceans.  That is because those are the only two animals that are common to those conditions that a mimic octopus can survive on.  They are believed to be carnivores, and are not known to eat any type of plant or vegetation.

References

Bibliography

 
  [children's book]

External links

Octopodidae
Molluscs described in 2005